Remi Elie (born April 16, 1995) is a Canadian professional ice hockey forward who is currently playing for Färjestad BK of the Swedish Hockey League (SHL). He was selected by the Dallas Stars in the 2nd round (40th overall) of the 2013 NHL Entry Draft.

Playing career
Elie was drafted 91st overall by the London Knights of the Ontario Hockey League in the 2011 OHL Priority Selection. After two seasons with the Knights, Elie was traded to the Belleville Bulls in exchange for Brady Austin.

On September 28, 2014, the Dallas Stars, who drafted Elie in the 2013 NHL Entry Draft, announced they had signed him to a three-year entry-level contract.  He proceeded to play with the Belleville Bulls for the 2014–15 season before joining the Erie Otters in a mid-season trade to conclude his junior career.

In the 2016–17 season, Elie, on his second NHL recall, made his NHL debut in the Stars 2-1 victory against the Florida Panthers on March 4, 2017. He scored his first NHL goal in a game against the San Jose Sharks on March 12, 2017. The following season, Elie, a restricted free agent, accepted the Stars qualifying offer of a one-year $735,000 contract for the 2018–19 season.

After participating at the Stars 2018–19 training camp, he was placed on waivers and claimed by the Buffalo Sabres. Elie served largely as a healthy scratch, appearing in 16 games with 1 assist before he was waived by the Sabres. Upon clearing, Elie was reassigned to AHL affiliate, the Rochester Americans on February 3, 2019.

On January 29, 2021, Elie as a free agent from the Sabres signed a one-year AHL contract to continue his tenure with the Rochester Americans. Elie enjoyed a successful shortened 2020–21 season with the Americans, appearing in 28 games and recording 10 goals and 19 points to lead the club in goals and was tied for second in points.

Elie secured a NHL as a free agent, agreeing to a one-year, two-way deal with back-to-back Stanley Cup champions the Tampa Bay Lightning on July 28, 2021.

Career statistics

References

External links 
 

1995 births
Belleville Bulls players
Buffalo Sabres players
Canadian ice hockey left wingers
Dallas Stars draft picks
Dallas Stars players
Erie Otters players
Färjestad BK players
Ice hockey people from Ontario
Living people
London Knights players
Rochester Americans players
Syracuse Crunch players
Tampa Bay Lightning players
Texas Stars players